The following lists events that happened during the year 2008 in Bosnia and Herzegovina.

Incumbents
Presidency:
Haris Silajdžić
Željko Komšić
Nebojša Radmanović
Prime Minister: Nikola Špirić 

 
Years of the 21st century in Bosnia and Herzegovina
2000s in Bosnia and Herzegovina
Bosnia and Herzegovina
Bosnia and Herzegovina